Escape Simulator is a first person puzzle video game developed by Pine Studio and released on October 19, 2021.

Gameplay and development
The game is based upon real-life escape rooms, where objects can be taken, inspected and broken and the objective for the player is to figure out how to escape the locked premises. Development took slightly less than two years. The game also comes with a tool which allows for the players to create their own rooms as well as co-op.

Release
In less than a week since its release, the game reportedly sold 50,000 copies with the revenue of 4 million HRK.

Reception

Screen Rant described it as a great way to experience an escape room digitally, calling it an "enjoyable experience" and giving it 3 1/2 out of 5 stars. The A.V. Club considered the game "genuinely thrilling" and the closest thing gaming has to an actual escape room. The Gamer named it as one of the best multiplayer games to play without a microphone. The Escape Room Artist team mentioned that it felt close to a real-life escape room game and listed it as one of their recommended online escape games. John Walker, in an article published on Kotaku, praised how well the first person perspective is combined with the realistic physics, saying it offers a far more tangible feeling of playing an actual escape room. Comic Book Resources called it a wonderfully charming game, praising its easy-to-use editor.

References

External links
Official website
Escape Simulator on Steam

Escape rooms
2021 video games
Video games developed in Croatia
Linux games
MacOS games
Puzzle video games
Windows games